The 1954 Pacific Tigers football team represented the College of the Pacific during the 1954 college football season.

Pacific competed as an independent in 1954. They played home games in Pacific Memorial Stadium in Stockton, California. In their second season under head coach Jack Myers, the Tigers finished with a record of four wins and five losses (4–5). For the season they were outscored by their opponents 99–118.

Schedule

Team players in the NFL
No College of the Pacific players were selected in the 1955 NFL Draft.

The following finished their college career in 1954, were not drafted, but played in the NFL.

Notes

References

Pacific
Pacific Tigers football seasons
Pacific Tigers football